The Mutual of Omaha Building is a 285-ft (87 m), 14-story skyscraper in midtown Omaha, Nebraska, United States. Built in 1970, it is currently the sixth tallest building in Omaha. The building houses the headquarters of Mutual of Omaha Insurance Company, and is the largest building in Mutual of Omaha's Midtown Crossing development.

Joined to the main building, the Mutual of Omaha Dome is an underground facility topped by a large glass dome. The dome houses an employee café.

The building's north face was covered with a large photograph of an Olympic swimmer in June 2008 as an advertisement for the U.S. Olympic swim trials being held in Omaha in July. Again, in June 2009 the company's north face was adorned in a larger-than-life tiger to celebrate its centennial (shown).

The building wrap was completed by Super Color Digital, a large-format digital printing company based in Orange County, California.

See also
Economy of Omaha, Nebraska
List of tallest buildings in Omaha, Nebraska

References

Skyscraper office buildings in Omaha, Nebraska
Insurance company headquarters in the United States
Midtown Omaha, Nebraska
Office buildings completed in 1970